The known history of Mauritius begins with its discovery by Arabs and Malays, followed by Europeans and its appearance on maps in the early 16th century. Mauritius was successively colonized by the Netherlands, France and Great Britain, and became independent in 12 March 1968.

Discovery
Mauritius was first discovered by the Moors. This is corroborated by the earliest existing historical evidence of the island on a map produced by the Italian cartographer Alberto Cantino in 1502.  Cantino shows three islands which are thought to represent the Mascarenes (Réunion, Mauritius and Rodrigues) and calls them Dina Margabin, Dina Arobi, and Dina Moraze. The medieval Arab world called the Indian Ocean island region Waqwaq.

Portuguese discoveries (1507–1513)
Mauritius was later discovered and visited by the Portuguese between 1507 and 1513. Mauritius and surrounding islands were known as the Mascarene Islands  after Pedro Mascarenhas.

An official world map by Diogo Ribeiro described "from west to east, the first island, 'Mascarenhas', the second, 'Santa Apolonia' and the third, 'Domingo Froiz.' " The three islands (Réunion, Mauritius and Rodrigues) were encountered some years earlier by chance during an exploratory expedition of the coast of the Bay of Bengal led by Tristão da Cunha. The expedition ran into a cyclone and was forced to change course. Thus, the ship Cirne of the captain Diogo Fernandes Pereira, came into view of Réunion island on 9 February 1507. They called the island "Santa Apolonia" ("Saint Apollonia") in honor of that day's saint. Mauritius was encountered during the same expedition and received the name of "Cirne" and Rodrigues that of "Diogo Rodrigues". Five years later, the islands were visited by Pedro Mascarenhas. who left the name "Mascarene" for the whole region. The Portuguese took no interest in these isolated islands. They were already established in Asia in Goa, on the coast of Malabar, on the island of Ceylon (now Sri Lanka) and on the Malaysian coast.

Their main African base was in Mozambique, therefore the Portuguese navigators preferred to use the Mozambique Channel to go to India. The Comoros to the north proved to be a more practical port of call. Thus no permanent colony was established on the island by the Portuguese.

Dutch East India Company era (1598–1710)

 (Logo of the Dutch East India Company)

In 1598, the second Dutch Expedition to Indonesia consisting of eight ships, under the orders of admirals Jacques Cornelius van Neck and Wybrandt van Warwyck, set sail from Texel, Netherlands, towards the Indian subcontinent. The eight ships ran into foul weather after passing the Cape of Good Hope and were separated. Three found their way to the northeast of Madagascar, while the remaining five regrouped and sailed in a southeasterly direction. On 17 September, the five ships under the orders of Admiral van Warwyck came into view of Mauritius. On 20 September, they entered a sheltered bay which they named "Port de Warwick" (now known as "Grand Port"). They landed and decided to name the island "Prins Mauritz van Nassaueiland," after the son of William the Silent, Prince Maurits (Latin version: Mauritius) of the House of Nassau, the stadtholder of most of the Dutch Republic, and after the main vessel of the fleet, the "Mauritius". From that time, only the name Mauritius has remained. On 2 October, the ships again took to the sea towards Bantam.

From then on, the island's Port de Warwick was used by Dutch ships as a stopover after long months at sea. In 1606, two expeditions came for the first time to what would later become Port-Louis in the northwest part of the island. The expedition, consisting of eleven ships and 1,357 men under the orders of Admiral Corneille, came into the bay, which they named "Rade des Tortues" (literally meaning "Harbor of the Tortoises") because of the great number of terrestrial tortoises they found there.  From that date, Dutch sailors shifted their choice to Rade des Tortues as a harbor.

In 1615, the shipwreck and death of governor Pieter Both, who was coming back from India with four richly laden ships in the bay, led Dutch sailors to consider the route cursed, and they tried to avoid it as much as possible. In the meantime, the British and the Danes were beginning to make incursions into the Indian Ocean. Those who landed on the island freely cut and took with them the precious heartwood of the ebony trees, then found in profusion all over the island.

Dutch colonization started in 1638 and ended in 1710, with a brief interruption between 1658 and 1666 (the year of Great Fire of London). Numerous governors were appointed, but continuous hardships such as cyclones, droughts, pest infestations, lack of food, and illnesses in the end took their toll, and the island was definitively abandoned in 1710.

The island was not permanently inhabited for the first forty years after its "discovery" by the Dutch, but in 1638 Cornelius Gooyer established the first permanent Dutch settlement in Mauritius with a garrison of twenty-five. He thus became the first governor of the island. In 1639, thirty more men came to reinforce the Dutch colony. Gooyer was instructed to develop the commercial potential of the island, but he did nothing of the sort, so he was recalled. His successor was Adriaan van der Stel, who began the development in earnest, developing the export of ebony wood. For that purpose, van der Stel brought 105 Malagasy slaves to the island. Within the first week, about sixty were able to escape into the forests; about twenty of them were recaptured.

In 1644, the islanders were faced with many months of hardships, due to delayed shipment of supplies, bad harvests, and cyclones. During those months, the colonists could only rely on their own ability to feed themselves by fishing and hunting. Nonetheless, van der Stel secured the shipment of 95 more servants from Madagascar, before being transferred to Ceylon. His replacement was Jacob van der Meersh. In 1645, the latter brought in 108 more Malagasy servants. Van der Meersh left Mauritius in September 1648 and was replaced by Reinier Por.

In 1652, more hardships befell the inhabitants, colonists and servants alike. The population was then about a hundred people. The continuing hardships affected the commercial potential of the island and a pullout was ordered in 1657. On 16 July 1658, all the inhabitants left the island apart from a ship's 'boy' and two servants who had taken shelter in the forests. <ref>Albert Pitot, T’Eyland Mauritius, Esquisses Historiques (1598–1710) 1905, p. 116</ref> Thus the first attempt at Dutch colonization ended badly.

In 1664, a second attempt also ended badly, as the men chosen for the job abandoned their sick commander, van Niewland, without proper treatment, and he died.

From 1666 to 1669, Dirk Jansz Smient administered the new colony at Port de Warwick, with the cutting down and export of ebony trees as the main activity. When Dirk Jansz Smient left, he was replaced by George Frederik Wreeden, who died in 1672, drowned with five other colonists during a reconnaissance expedition. His replacement would be Hubert Hugo. Hugo was a man of vision and wanted to make the island into an agricultural colony. His vision was not shared by his superiors, and he eventually had to abandon the attempt.

Issac Johannes Lamotius became the new governor when Hugo left in 1677. Lamotius governed until 1692, when he was deported to Batavia for judgment for persecuting a colonist whose wife had refused his courtship. A new governor, Roelof Diodati, was then appointed in 1692. Diodati faced many problems in his attempts to develop the island, such as cyclones, pest infestations, cattle illnesses, and droughts.

On 7 January 1702, the pirate John Bowen foundered his ship called the 'speaker' onto a 'Swarte Klip' beach (a black rock beach?) on the East of Mauritius. A hundred and seventy pirates armed to the teeth against a poorly armed and frail Dutch population of fifty meant the 'crafty' Diodati had no choice but to sell them a small sloop for them to enlarge so as to leave Mauritius.

Eventually discouraged, Diodati gave up and his replacement was Abraham Momber van de Velde. The latter fared no better but remained the last Dutch governor of the island until it was abandoned in 1710, again.

Slaves were not particularly well treated by the colonists, and revolts or the act of organizing one were severely repressed and punished. Some punishments consisted of amputation of various parts of the body and exposure in the open air for a day as example to others, eventually culminating in condemned slaves’ execution at sunset.

The legacy of the Dutch in Mauritius includes:
Providing the name for the country and for many regions over the whole island. Some examples include "Pieter Both" mountain and the "Vandermeersh" region near Rose-Hill, as well as many other names.
Introduction of sugar cane plants from Java.
Decimating the local dodo and giant tortoise populations for food and by introducing competing species and pests, sometimes involuntarily.
Clearing of large swathes of ancient forests for ebony wood exploitation in Europe.

French rule (1715–1810)

Abandoned by the Dutch, the island became a French colony when, in September 1715, Guillaume Dufresne d'Arsel landed and took possession of this port of call on the route to India. He named the island "Isle de France". Six years later, in 1721, the French started their occupation. However, it was only from 1735, with the arrival of the French governor, Mahé de La Bourdonnais, that "Isle de France" started developing effectively. Mahé de La Bourdonnais planted spices such as pepper, cinnamon and cloves at "Jardin Pamplemousses".
Mahé de La Bourdonnais established Port Louis as a naval base and a shipbuilding centre. Under his governorship, numerous buildings were built, a number of which still stand today: part of Government House, the Château de Mon Plaisir at Pamplemousses and the Line Barracks. In early 1729 Indians from Pondicherry arrived in Mauritius aboard the vessel La Sirène. Work contracts for these craftsmen were signed in 1734 at the time when they acquired their freedom. The island was under the administration of the French East India Company which maintained its presence until 1767. In 1796 the French settlers broke away from French control when the government in Paris attempted to abolish slavery. During the French rule slaves were brought from parts of Africa such as Mozambique, Madagascar and Zanzibar. As a result, the island's population rose dramatically from 15,000 to 49,000 within 30 years. During the late 18th century African slaves accounted for around 80 percent of the island's population, and by the early 19th century there were 60,000 slaves on the island.

In 1806, the Governor General, Charles Mathieu Isidore Decaen, created the city of Mahébourg, named in honour of Mahé de La Bourdonnais. It was originally known as Bourg Mahé. From that year until 1810, the island was in charge of officials appointed by the French government, except for a brief period during the French Revolution, when the inhabitants set up a government virtually independent of France.

During the Napoleonic wars, the "Isle de France" became a base from which French corsairs organised successful raids on British commercial ships. The raids continued until 1810 when a strong British expedition was sent to capture the island. A preliminary attack was foiled at Grand Port in August 1810, but the main attack launched in December of the same year from Rodrigues, which had been captured during the same year, was successful. Rodrigues had previously been visited only for fresh water and food by the British in 1809. In late November 1810 the British landed in large numbers in the north of the island near Cap Malheureux and rapidly overpowered the French, who capitulated on 3 December 1810. By the Treaty of Paris in 1814, the "Isle de France", which was renamed "Mauritius" was ceded to Great Britain, together with Rodrigues and the Seychelles. In the act of capitulation, the British guaranteed that they would respect the languages, the customs, the laws and the traditions of the inhabitants.

British rule (1810–1968)

Despite the only French naval victory (during the Napoleonic Wars) of Battle of Grand Port on 19 and 20 August 1810 by a fleet commanded by Pierre Bouvet, Mauritius was captured on 3 December 1810 by the British under Commodore Josias Rowley. Their possession of the island was confirmed four years later by the Treaty of Paris (1814). French institutions, including the Napoleonic code of law, were maintained. The French language was at that moment still used more widely than English.

The British administration, which began with Robert Townsend Farquhar as governor, was followed by rapid social and economic changes. One of the most important events was the abolition of slavery on 1 February 1835. The planters received compensation of two million pounds sterling for the loss of their slaves who had been imported from Africa and Madagascar during the French occupation.
Sir George Ferguson Bowen was governor from 1879 to 1883.

Mauritian Creoles trace their origins to the plantation owners and slaves who were brought to work the sugar fields. 
When slavery was abolished on 1 February 1835, an attempt was made to secure a cheap source of adaptable labour for intensive sugar plantations in Mauritius. Indentured labour began with Chinese, Malay, African and Malagasy labourers, but ultimately, it was India which supplied the much needed laborers to Mauritius. This period of intensive use of Indian labour took place during British rule, with many brutal episodes and a long struggle by the indentured for respect. The term applied to the indentured during this period, and which has since become a derogatory term for Mauritians of Asian descent, was Coolie. The island soon became the key-point in the trade of indentured laborers, as thousands of Indians set forth from Calcutta or Karikal; not only did they modify the social, political and economic physiognomies of the island, but some also went farther, to the West Indies.

Indo-Mauritians are descended from Indian immigrants, most of whom arrived between 1835 and 1924 via the Coolie Ghat to work as indentured labourers after slavery was abolished in 1835. Included in the Indo-Mauritian community are Muslims (about 17% of the population) from the Indian subcontinent. The Franco-Mauritian elite controlled nearly all of the large sugar estates and was active in business and banking. As the Indian population became numerically dominant and the voting franchise was extended, political power shifted from the Franco-Mauritians and their Creole allies to the Indo-Mauritians.

The meeting of a mosaic of people from India, China, Africa and Europe began a process of hybridisation and intercultural frictions and dialogues, which poet Khal Torabully has termed "coolitude". This social reality is a major reference for identity opened to otherness and is widely used in Mauritius where it represents a humanism of diversity.

Conflicts arose between the Indian community (mostly sugarcane labourers) and the Franco-Mauritians in the 1920s, leading to severalmainly Indiandeaths. Following this, the Mauritius Labour Party was founded in 1936 by Maurice Curé to safeguard the interest of the labourers. Curé was succeeded a year later by Emmanuel Anquetil who tried to gain the support of the port workers. After his death, Guy Rozemont took over the leadership of the party.

The Mauritius Territorial Force, comprising coastal artillery and infantry formations was created in 1934. Due to the escalation of the Second World War, the force expanded to comprise two battalions. It was renamed the Mauritius Regiment in 1943.

During the Second World War, thousands of Mauritians volunteered or were conscripted as military labourers, construction workers or infantry soldiers. Many served in the Royal Pioneer Corps in the Middle East and Southern Europe. Several Franco-Mauritians were killed while serving as agents of the Special Operations Executive, regular British forces or the Free French Forces. In December 1943, the 1000-strong Mauritius Regiment mutinied on Madagascar when the soldiers felt betrayed for being sent abroad, as they had enlisted for service only in Mauritius. 

Mauritius was an important base for cable and wireless information gathering as well as a base to counter the activities of Japanese submarines and the German Monsoon Group.

More than 1500 Central European jews were denied entry to Palestine in 1940 by the British and instead detained in Beau Bassin until 1945.

Elections in August 1948 for the newly created Legislative Council (under the revised 1947 Constitution) marked Mauritius's first steps toward self-rule. It was the first time that women were represented and a significant number of Indo-Mauritians and Creoles were elected. The previous Council of Government was replaced by the new Legislative Council composed of 19 elected members, 12 members nominated by the Governor and 3 ex-officio members. The first sitting of the Legislative Council took place on 1 September 1948.

Independence (1968)

An independence campaign gained momentum after 1961, when the British agreed to permit additional self-government and eventual independence. A coalition composed of the Mauritian Labour Party (MLP), the Comité d'Action Musulman (CAM), and the Independent Forward Bloc (IFB)a traditionalist Hindu partywon a majority in the 1967 Legislative Assembly election, despite opposition from Franco-Mauritian and Creole supporters of Sir Gaetan Duval QC's and Jules Koenig's Mauritian Social Democratic Party (PMSD). The Labour-IFB-CAM coalition was known as Independence Party (Mauritius). Sir Seewoosagur Ramgoolam, Chief Minister in the colonial government, became the first prime minister after independence, on 12 March 1968. The date of 12 March was specifically chosen to coincide with Mahatma Gandhi's Salt March which occurred on 12 March 1930. Between 1965 and 1968 there were various ethnic riots which could only be brought under control with assistance from British troops who flew in from South-East Asia. The communal strife that preceded independence led to around 300 deaths.

British rule ended on 12 March 1968 with the Mauritius Independence Act 1968. The British monarch, Elizabeth II, remained nominal head of state as Queen of Mauritius. Her constitutional roles were delegated to the Governor-General of Mauritius. The last governor, Sir John Shaw Rennie served as the first governor-general until 27 August 1968.

Whilst in power the Labour-IFB-CAM coalition (Independence Party (Mauritius)) disintegrated by 1969, most IFB MPs landed on opposition benches whilst most PMSD MPs joined the Labour-CAM government. The remaining PMSD MPs who refused to follow Gaetan Duval formed a new party called Union Démocratique Mauricienne (UDM) which together with the IFB formed the opposition to the Labour-CAM-PMSD government. In 1969, the Mouvement Militant Mauricien led by Paul Bérenger and Heeralall Bhugaloo emerged. The first MMM MP (Dev Virahsawmy) was elected in 1970 at a by-election of Constituency No. 5 following the death of IFB MP Lall Jugnauth. Until 1982, Sir Seewoosagur Ramgoolam was prime minister, his Labour Party in coalition with Duval's PMSD. In 1982, the coalition of Mouvement Militant Mauricien/Parti Socialiste Mauricien (MMM-PSM) came to power in a landslide electoral victory, with Sir Anerood Jugnauth QC as prime minister and Harish Boodhoo as the Deputy Prime Minister. The coalition split in 1983, with Sir Anerood Jugnauth QC forming the Mouvement Socialiste Mauricien'' (MSM), which became the governing party, with Jugnauth as prime minister. Following the electoral defeat of 1982 Sir Satcam Boolell was dismissed from the Labour Party, which led him to form a new party, Mouvement Patriotique Mauricien (MPM), before returning to the Labour Party in 1983. Sir Seewoosagur Ramgoolam subsequently became Governor General.

After Seewoosagur's death in 1985 Satcam Boolell became Leader of the Labour Party. In 1990 Seewoosagur's son, Navin Ramgoolam, succeeded him as leader of the party which was defeated at the 1991 elections, which saw Sir Anerood Jugnauth QC re-elected under a MMM-MSM government.

The Republic of Mauritius was proclaimed on 12 March 1992. Following the abolition of the monarchy, the last Governor General of Mauritius, Sir Veerasamy Ringadoo became the first President of Mauritius, functioning as a ceremonial figurehead.

Republic (1992-present)
In December 1991, the Constitution was amended to make Mauritius a republic within the Commonwealth. Mauritius became a republic on 12 March 1992, with the last governor general, Sir Veerasamy Ringadoo, as interim president. He was succeeded by Cassam Uteem on 30 June 1992.

Dr. Navin Ramgoolam led a MLP-MMM coalition to victory at the 1995 general elections, replacing Sir Aneerood Jugnauth QC as prime minister, a post the latter had occupied for 13 years. The governing coalition split in 1997, with the MMM going back to the Opposition and Dr. Navin Ramgoolam staying on as prime minister.

At the next elections in 2000, Sir Anerood Jugnauth's MSM, in coalition with Paul Bérenger's MMM was returned to power, with Sir Anerood Jugnauth QC appointed as prime minister. He subsequently retired as prime minister after 3 years and assumed the office of president. For the remaining time of the elected government the prime minister's post was filled by Paul Bérenger. At the 2005 general elections, the MLP-led Alliance Sociale coalition won the elections, and Dr. Navin Ramgoolam became prime minister while Sir Anerood Jugnauth QC remained the president. The 2010 general elections saw the victory of a MLP-MSM-PMSD coalition (known as "L'Alliance de l'Avenir") and the maintaining of Dr. Navin Ramgoolam as prime minister. A year or so later, Sir Anerood Jugnauth QC left the presidency and was replaced by Kailash Purryag, an attorney at law and politician, who has served the country as senior minister on many occasions under the leadership of Dr. Navin Ramgoolam.
The 2014 general elections saw the victory of a MSM-PMSD-ML coalition (known as "L'alliance Lepep") and Sir Aneerood Jugnauth became Prime Minister while Kailash Prayag remained the president until 2016 when Mrs Ameena Gureeb Fakim became the first female president. However, she resigned  over a financial scandal in March 2018.

In January 2017, Prime Minister Anerood Jugnauth stepped down to hand power to his son, Pravind. In November 2019, Mauritius’ ruling Militant Socialist Movement (MSM) won more than half of the seats in the 2019 elections, securing incumbent Prime Minister Pravind Kumar Jugnauth a new five-year term.

See also
History of Africa
History of Southern Africa
Politics of Mauritius
List of prime ministers of Mauritius
Governor of Mauritius (disambiguation)
 Port Louis history and timeline

Notes and references

External links
The Mauritius Museums Council, a body corporate under the aegis of the Ministry of Arts and Culture
History of Mauritius island
WorldStatesmen- Mauritius
History of Mauritius in the French period
Gallery detailing the history of Mauritius